Cuthbert Mark Dignam (20 March 1909 – 29 September 1989) was a prolific English actor.

Born in London, the son of a salesman in the steel industry, Dignam grew up in Sheffield, and was educated at the Jesuit College, where he appeared in numerous Shakespearean plays.

He learned his craft touring Britain and America with Ben Greet's Shakespeare company. His range extended from the Louis Macneice radio play, The Dark Tower in the 1940s to the TV thriller, The XYY Man in the late 1970s.

Along with Philip Guard and John Bryning, Dignam can be heard on the fade-out of the Beatles' song "I Am the Walrus", during which is played a 1967 BBC radio broadcast of King Lear, with Dignam in the role of the Earl of Gloucester.

Dignam was married three times, divorced twice (his character in The XYY Man frequently complains about the expense of maintaining multiple ex-wives).

Family
His brother Basil was also a well-known character actor and his sister-in-law was the actress Mona Washbourne.

Dollis Hill
Dignam lived in Dollis Hill, north-west London, from 1967 until his death in 1989.

Selected filmography

 Train of Events (1949) - Bolingbroke (segment "The Actor")
 Murder in the Cathedral (1951) - First Knight
 The Maggie (1954) - The Laird
 Doctor in the House (1954) - Examiner at Microscope (uncredited)
 Beau Brummell (1954) - Mr. Burke
 Lease of Life (1954) - Mr. Black
 The Passing Stranger (1954) - Inspector
 Carrington V.C. (1955) - Prosecutor
 The Prisoner (1955) - The Governor
 Escapade (1955) - Sykes
 They Can't Hang Me (1955) - Prison Governor
 The Adventures of Quentin Durward (1955) - Innkeeper (uncredited)
 Sink the Bismarck! (1960) - Captain (Ark Royal)
 The Pure Hell of St Trinian's (1960) - Prosecuting Counsel
 No Love for Johnnie (1961) - Earnley Constituent (uncredited)
 In Search of the Castaways (1962) - Rich Man at Yacht Party
 Lancelot and Guinevere (1963) - Merlin
 Siege of the Saxons (1963) - King Arthur
 Tom Jones (1963) - Lieutenant
 Dr. Syn, Alias the Scarecrow (1963) - The Bishop
 The Eyes of Annie Jones (1964) - Orphanage director
 Clash by Night (1964) - Sydney Selwyn
 A Jolly Bad Fellow (1964) - The Master
 Game for Three Losers (1965) - Attorney General
 The Taming of the Shrew (1967) - Vincentio
 Frozen Flashes (1967) - Sir John
 The Charge of the Light Brigade (1968) - Gen. Airey
 Isadora (1968) - (uncredited)
 Hamlet (1969) - Polonius
 The Mind of Mr. J.G. Reeder (1969–1971) - Lord Nettlefold
 There's a Girl in My Soup (1970) - Wedding Guest (uncredited)
 Jude the Obscure (1971) - Vicar 
 Dead Cert (1974) - Clifford Tudor
 Memoirs of a Survivor (1981) - Newsvendor
 The Chain (1984) - Ambrose
 On the Black Hill (1988) - Reverend Latimer (final film role)

Radio 

 The Dark Tower (1946)

References

External links
 
 

1909 births
1989 deaths
English male film actors
English male stage actors
Male actors from Sheffield
20th-century English male actors